The Irda is a fantasy novel by Linda P. Baker, set in the world of Dragonlance, and based on the Dungeons & Dragons role-playing game. It is the second novel in the "Lost Histories" series. It was published in paperback in June 1995.

Plot summary
The Irda (Children of the Stars) details the historical roots and struggles of the Irda, the high ogres of Krynn.

Reception

Reviews
Kliatt

References

1995 novels
Dragonlance novels